Tipeni is a village located in Panchpokhari Thangpal rural municipality in Sindhupalchok District of Bagmati Province of Nepal. The aerial distance from Tipeni to Nepal's capital Kathmandu is approximately 36 km. Tipeni has an elevation of 1,189m above sea level.

See also
 Panchpokhari Thangpal

References

Villages in Sindhupalchok District
Populated places in Sindhupalchowk District